Heisnam Kanhailal (17 January 1941 – 6 October 2016) was an Indian art theatre personality. For his work, he was awarded the Padma Shri civilian award in 2004 and the Padma Bhushan civilian award in 2016 by the Government of India. He was the founder-director of Kalakshetra Manipur, a theatre laboratory established in 1969 that explores a new vocabulary in the existing language of theatre.

Kanhailal was born in Keisamthong Thangjam Lairak, Imphal.

Kanhailal was awarded the Sangeet Natak Akademi Award in Direction in 1985,  given by the Sangeet Natak Akademi, India's National Academy of Music, Dance & Drama.
In December 2011, he was awarded the Sangeet Natak Akademi Ratna Award, the highest ranked and most valued Akademi award.

Kanhailal was married to Sabitri Heisnam, his theatre associate and a fellow Padma Shri awardee. He died after an illness in Imphal on 6 October 2016.

References

Indian autographs
Hindu images

External links
 Heisnam Kanhailal, Profile

1941 births
2016 deaths
Indian theatre directors
Indian drama teachers
Artists from Manipur
Recipients of the Padma Shri in arts
Recipients of the Sangeet Natak Akademi Award
Recipients of the Sangeet Natak Akademi Fellowship
Recipients of the Padma Bhushan in arts
People from Imphal